James Franklin Clarke, Jr. was an American historian who dedicated his life to the study of the history of the activities of American Protestants and their missionaries on the Balkans, and especially contributed to the spreading of Protestantism in Bulgaria. He founded the Academic Studies on Bulgarian history in the United States.

Biography 
He was born on June 5, 1906, in Bitola, now in North Macedonia, where his father, William P. Clarke, was a missionary. He was the grandson of James Franklin Clarke Sr., who was one of the first American missionaries among the Bulgarians. During the Balkan Wars and World War I, the William Clarke family lived in Bitola. In 1919, they moved to Thessaloniki. They later moved to Switzerland and then to England, where James received a primary education. The family moved to the United States, where James graduated from high school in Boston. In 1924, Clarke enrolled at Amherst College in Massachusetts. In 1928, he earned a scholarship to Harvard University, where he received his master's degree. One year later, he began his doctoral thesis on the role of American missionaries in Bulgaria and their impact on the process of the Bulgarian National Revival. From 1931 to 1934, Clarke worked in the Bulgarian archives and libraries, visiting numerous settlements related to his research. In 1946, he was a press and culture attaché at the US Embassy in Sofia. From 1951 to 1954, he was professor of history at Indiana University, where he became the founder and director of the first Institute for Eastern European Studies. From 1954 to 1976, when he retired, he was affiliated with the University of Pittsburgh, one of the centers of Eastern European studies in the United States. After retirement, Clarke was a consultant to Duquesne University.

Clarke, as well as his missionary predecessors who were direct observers of the Balkan historical scene, adhered to the perception of the Bulgarian identity of the Macedonian Slavs. Without denying the right of this population to self-identity, he defined the concept on the  "Macedonian language" as a myth, arguing with his American counterpart Horace Lunt. He is the author of a collection of studies on Bulgarian history, called The pen and the sword, edited by Dennis P. Hupchick.

On December 5, 1982, Clarke died at his home in Pittsburgh.

Notes

External links
 Среща и взаимодействие на културите: американското мисионерско семейство Кларк и българската среда XIX-ХХ век. Румен Генов (in Bulgarian).]

1908 births
1982 deaths
20th-century American historians
American male non-fiction writers
University of Pittsburgh faculty
Amherst College alumni
Harvard University alumni
American expatriates in Bulgaria
Protestantism in Bulgaria
People from Bitola
20th-century American male writers